The kafala system (also spelled "kefala system"; ; meaning "sponsorship system") is a system used to monitor migrant laborers, working primarily in the construction and domestic sectors in Gulf Cooperation Council member states and a few neighboring countries, namely Qatar, Bahrain, Kuwait, Lebanon, Oman, Saudi Arabia and the United Arab Emirates.

The system requires all migrant workers to have an in-country sponsor, usually their employer, who is responsible for their visa and legal status. This practice has been criticized by human rights organizations for creating easy opportunities for the exploitation of workers, as many employers take away passports and abuse their workers with little chance of legal repercussions.

According to The Economist, "The migrant workers' lot is unlikely to improve until the reform of the kafala system, whereby workers are beholden to the employers who sponsored their visas. The system blocks domestic competition for overseas workers in the Gulf countries."

Legal context and etymology
 See also History of slavery in the Muslim world
In Islamic adoptional jurisprudence, "kafala" refers to the adoption of children. The original law of kafala was expanded to include a system of fixed-term sponsorship of migrant workers in several countries in the late twentieth century. In the first decades of the twenty-first century, the migrant worker system became widely referred to in English as the "kafala system".

Bahrain
 See also Slavery in Bahrain

Repeal
In 2009, Bahrain was the first country in the Gulf Cooperation Council (GCC) to claim to repeal the kafala system. In a public statement the Labor Minister likened the system to slavery. Changes to the Labour Market Regulatory Suggestion were made in April 2009 and implemented starting 1 August 2009. Under the new law, migrants are sponsored by the Labour Market Regulation Authority and can change from one employer to another without their employer's agreement. Three months' notice is required to quit from an employer.

However, in November 2009 Human Rights Watch (HRW) stated that "authorities do little to enforce compliance" with "employers who withhold wages and passports from migrant employees ... practices [which] are illegal under Bahraini law."

Kuwait

The kafala system is practiced in Kuwait. In 2018, Kuwait became involved in a diplomatic crisis with the Philippines, which ended in a May 2018 labor deal which prohibited common practices under the kafala against Filipino migrant workers, including the confiscation of passports and guaranteeing one-day off a week from work.

Saudi Arabia

According to a 2008 HRW report, under the kafala system in Saudi Arabia, "an employer assumes responsibility for a hired migrant worker and must grant explicit permission before the worker can enter Saudi Arabia, transfer employment, or leave the country. The kafala system gives the employer immense control over the worker." HRW stated that "some abusive employers exploit the kafala system and force domestic workers to continue working against their will and forbid them from returning to their countries of origin" and that this is "incompatible with Article 13 of the Universal Declaration of Human Rights".

HRW stated that "the combination of the high recruitment fees paid by Saudi employers and the power granted them by the kafala system to control whether a worker can change employers or exit the country made some employers feel entitled to exert 'ownership' over a domestic worker" and that the "sense of ownership ... creates slavery-like conditions". In 2018, France 24 and ALQST reported on the use of Twitter and other online social networks by kafala system employers, "kafils", to "sell" domestic workers to other kafils, in violation of Saudi law. ALQST described the online trading as "slavery 2.0".

Several Indonesian domestic workers were executed in Saudi Arabia during 2015–2018. Siti Zaeneb and Karni were beheaded in April 2015. Muhammad Zaini Misin was executed in March 2018 for having killed his employer. On 29 October 2018, Tuti Tursilawati, also an Indonesian domestic worker in Saudi Arabia, was executed for having killed her employer, an action which she claimed had been in self-defense in relation to sexual abuse. Indonesian Foreign Minister Retno Marsudi lodged an official complaint concerning the execution, which was carried out without warning and despite an appeal against the sentence.

From 1991 to 2019,  Bangladeshi women went to Saudi Arabia under the kafala system. In early November 2019, protests took place in Dhaka in response to the case of Sumi Akter, who claimed "merciless sexual assaults", being locked up for 15 days, and having her hands burnt by hot oil by her Saudi employers. The case of another Bangladeshi, Nazma Begum, who claimed being tortured, also attracted media attention. Both had been promised jobs as hospital cleaning staff but were tricked into becoming household servants. Begum died in Saudi Arabia of an untreated illness.

On 4 November 2020, as part of its 2030 vision, Saudi Arabia announced a reformation plan for its labor law. Effective on 14 March 2021, the new measures are meant to curb the kafala system through:
 Mandatory digital documentation of labor contracts.
 Dropping the stipulation of sponsor consent for exit visas, final exit visas, re-entry visas, and change of sponsor, so long as they are to be applied for after the end of a contractual term or an appropriate notice period previously specified in the contract. Other requirements may still apply in case of applying within a contractual term.
The changes are to be implemented in the Absher and Qiwa portals, both being part of the e-government in Saudi Arabia.

In March 2021, Saudi Arabia introduced new labour reforms, allowing some migrant workers to change jobs without their employer's consent. Human Rights Watch claimed that the reforms didn't dismantle the abuses of the kafala system, "leaving migrant workers at high risk of abuse". Many domestic workers and farmers who are not covered by the labour law are still vulnerable to multifold abuses, including passport confiscation, delayed wages and even forced labour. Although migrant workers are allowed to request an exit permit without their employer's permission, the need to have an exit permit in order to leave the country is a human rights violation.

An investigation by France 24 in April 2021 documented abuses of female migrant workers in Saudi Arabia. A 22-year-old woman migrant worker from Madagascar was murdered by the underground prostitution mafia she used to work for after running away from her employer's home and buried without a coffin in al-Jubail. Due to the practice of some sponsors who confiscate the passports of migrant workers, young women from East Africa find it difficult to return home after perceived mistreatment by their employers. The women often end up falling into prostitution.

Qatar
 See also Slavery in Qatar
About 1.2 million foreign workers in Qatar, mostly from India, Pakistan, Bangladesh, Nepal, and the Philippines, make up 94 percent of the labor force. There are nearly five foreign workers for each Qatari citizen, mostly housemaids and low-skilled workers.

Most of the workers live under conditions that Human Rights Watch has likened to "forced labor". Sharan Burrow, General Secretary of the International Trade Union Confederation, stated "In late 2010 we conducted a risk assessment looking at basic fundamental labor rights. The Gulf region stood out like a red light. They were absolutely at the bottom end for rights for workers. They were fundamentally slave states." An exit visa system prevents workers from leaving the country without the sponsor's permission. Employer consent is required to change jobs, leave the country, get a driver's license, rent a home or open a checking account. Amnesty International witnessed workers signing false statements that they had received their wages in order to have their passports returned. The organization called for an overhaul of the 'sponsorship' system. Arab-American businessman Nasser Beydoun described their situation as: "Foreign workers in Qatar are modern-day slaves to their local employers. The local Qatari owns you." International media attention increased after Qatar was named the host of the 2022 FIFA World Cup. In March 2022, FIFA President Gianni Infantino met with the Qatar Minister of Labour Dr. Ali bin Samikh Al Marri to discuss about the progress achieved in the area of workers welfare and labour rights. The meeting also revealed the Law No. 18 of 2022 of Qatar's labour reforms that mandated the removal of employer's permission to change jobs while establishing a non-discriminatory minimum wage for all.

The kafala or sponsorship system practised by GCC nations has been stated as the main reason for abuse of the rights of low-income migrant workers.

Little discussed is the fact that high-income professional expatriate workers are also deeply affected by the abuse of the system by companies. A confounding issue is that many of the companies are based out of western nations from the EU, and the US.

The most typical form of abuse by these companies is the refusal to release employees once their employment has ended with the company. This lack of release (typically through a No Objection Certificate or NOC) restricts employees from moving to another company in Qatar after employment has ended with the present employer.

This prohibition executed by the company will keep the typical employee from working in Qatar for two years beyond the time their employment ended. In worse cases, the company holds the employee indefinitely in an effort to extort money from the employee when business opportunities fail. From the highest executives to the lowest secretaries, this policy is damaging and serves as a constant threat over the employee.

On 13 December 2016, the Qatari government introduced a new labour law which it said would bring "tangible benefits" to workers in the country by abolishing the Kafala system. The new regulations, aimed at making it easier for migrant workers to change jobs and leave the country, came into effect immediately. Amnesty International characterized the reforms as inadequate and continuing to "leave migrant workers at the hands of exploitative bosses".

In January 2020, Qatar issued a ministerial decree that abolished the exit visa requirement that was part of the Kafala system. With the exit visa requirement removed, migrants working in Qatar no longer need to obtain employer permission to leave Qatar. The International Labour Organization described the decree as an "important milestone in the ... labour reform agenda". Human Rights Watch considered the change as insufficient, since the requirement for employer consent for changing jobs and discrimination in permanent minimum wage levels remained, and migrant workers "still [faced] arrest and deportation [for leaving] their employer without permission".

In August 2020, the Qatari government announced a monthly minimum wage for all workers of 1,000 riyals (US$266), an increase from the previous temporary minimum wage of 750 riyals (US$200) a month. The No Objection Certificate was also removed so that employees can change jobs without consent of the current employer. A Minimum Wage Committee was also formed to check on the implementation.

2022 FIFA World Cup

The issue of migrant workers' rights in Qatar attracted greater attention since the 2022 FIFA World Cup was awarded to Qatar, with a 2013 investigation by The Guardian newspaper claiming that many workers were denied food and water, had their identity papers taken away from them, compelled to forced labor, and that they were not paid on time or at all, making some of them effectively slaves. The Guardian estimated that, by the time the competition would be held, without reforms of the kafala system, out of the 2 million-strong migrant workforce up to 4,000 workers could die due to lax safety and other causes. These claims were based upon the fact that 522 Nepalese workers and over 700 Indian workers had died since 2010, when Qatar's bid as World Cup's host had been won, about 250 Indian workers dying each year. Given that there were half a million Indian workers in Qatar, the Indian government said that was quite a normal number of deaths.

In 2015, a crew of four journalists from the BBC were arrested and held for two days after they attempted to report on the condition of workers in the country. The reporters had been invited to visit the country as guests of the Government of Qatar. The Wall Street Journal reported in June 2015 the International Trade Union Confederation's claim that over 1,200 workers had died while working on infrastructure and real-estate projects related to the World Cup, and the Qatar Government's counter-claim that none had. The BBC later reported that this often-cited figure of 1,200 workers having died in World Cup construction in Qatar between 2011 and 2013 is not correct, and that the 1,200 number is instead representing deaths from all Indians and Nepalese working in Qatar, not just of those workers involved in the preparation for the World Cup, and not just of construction workers.

Most Qatari nationals avoid doing manual work or low-skilled jobs. They are given preference in the workplace. Michael van Praag, president of the Royal Dutch Football Association, requested the FIFA Executive Committee to pressure Qatar over those allegations to ensure better workers' conditions. He also stated that a new vote on the attribution of the World Cup to Qatar would have to take place if the corruption allegations were to be proved.

In March 2016, Amnesty International accused Qatar of using forced labour, forcing the employees to live in poor conditions, and withholding their wages and passports. It also accused FIFA of failing to stop the stadium from being built on "human right abuses." Migrant workers told Amnesty about verbal abuse and threats they received after complaining about not being paid for up to several months. Nepali workers were even denied leave to visit their family after the 2015 Nepal earthquake.

In October 2017, the International Trade Union Confederation said that Qatar had signed an agreement to improve the situation of more than 2 million migrant workers in the country. According to the ITUC, the agreement provided for establishing substantial reforms in labour system, including ending the Kafala system. The ITUC also stated that the agreement would positively affect the general situation of workers, especially those who work on the 2022 FIFA World Cup infrastructure projects. The workers will no longer need their employer's permission to leave the country or change their jobs. Amnesty International have questioned whether Qatar would complete the promised labour reforms before the start of the World Cup, a sentiment that FIFA backed. Amnesty International found that abuses were still occurring despite the nation taking some steps to improve labour rights.

In May 2019, an investigation by the UK's Daily Mirror newspaper discovered some of the 28,000 workers on the stadiums are being paid 750 Qatari Riyal per month, which is equivalent to £190 per month or 99 pence an hour for a typical 48-hour week. Hendriks Graszoden, the turf supplier for the 2006 World Cup and for the European Championships in 2008 and 2016, refused to supply Qatar with World Cup turf. According to company spokesperson Gerdien Vloet, one reason for this decision was the accusations of human rights abuses.

In April 2020, the government of Qatar provided $824 million to pay the wages of migrant workers in quarantine or undergoing treatment for COVID-19. Later that year, the Qatari government announced a monthly minimum wage for all workers of 1,000 riyals (US$275), an increase from the previous temporary minimum wage of 750 riyals a month. The new laws went into effect in March 2021. The International Labour Organization said "Qatar is the first country in the region to introduce a non-discriminatory minimum wage, which is a part of a series of historical reforms of the country's labour laws," while the campaign group Migrant Rights said the new minimum wage was too low to meet migrant workers' need with Qatar's high cost of living.

Employers are obligated to pay 300 riyals for food and 500 riyals for accommodation, if they do not provide employees with these directly. The No Objection Certificate was removed so that employees can change jobs without consent of the current employer. A Minimum Wage Committee was also formed to check on the implementation. These reforms removed the kafala system and a contractual system was introduced.

An investigative report published by The Guardian used data from embassies and national foreign employment offices to estimate migrant worker death toll since World Cup was awarded to Qatar. Between 2010 and late 2020 over 6,500 migrant workers from India, Bangladesh, Pakistan, Nepal and Sri Lanka have died in Qatar. At the 2022 FIFA Congress in Doha, Lise Klaveness—head of the Norwegian Football Federation—criticised the organisation for having awarded the World Cup to Qatar, citing the various controversies surrounding the tournament. She argued that "in 2010 World Cups were awarded by FIFA in unacceptable ways with unacceptable consequences. Human rights, equality, democracy: the core interests of football were not in the starting XI until many years later. These basic rights were pressured onto the field as substitutes by outside voices. FIFA has addressed these issues but there's still a long way to go." Hassan al-Thawadi, secretary general of Qatar 2022, criticised her remarks for ignoring the country's recent labour reforms. The European Union's Annual Report on Human Rights and Democracy in the World 2021 noted Qatar's labour law reforms had incorporated non-discriminatory minimum wage systems and removal of the Kafala system in 2021.

In March 2022, FIFA president Gianni Infantino claimed in an interview that the Gulf nation is being progressive in terms of the labour rights and migrant rights issues that prevailed previously, adding "I am pleased to see the strong commitment from the Qatari authorities to ensure the reforms are fully implemented across the labour market, leaving a lasting legacy of the FIFA World Cup long after the event, and benefiting migrant workers in the host country in the long term." Shortly before the tournament, France 24 broadcast a report titled "The plight of migrant workers in Qatar", adding more details to the controversy and how many reform laws have not been followed.

On 20 October 2022, Amnesty International published an article in which it criticized the reforms done by Qatar for migrant workers and stated that these reforms are unfinished and compensation still owed as World Cup looms. And also stated that although Qatar has made important strides on labor rights over the past five years, it is abundantly clear that there is a great distance still to go. However the reforms have taken place in the run-up to Qatar's hosting of the 2022 FIFA World cup, an event that has put the country in the spotlight. The Qatari government has always affirmed that the world cup is not the finish line, the reforms will continue to implement even after the event is over. The government has strengthened its wage protection system and also added a new complaints platform that has increased access, and because the Wage protection system (WPS) monitors payments electronically, most cases (84 percent in 2021–2022) decided in favor of workers. There has been an increase in the amount paid out to the Workers’ Support and Insurance Fund between 2021 and 2022. A social dialogue structure was also established by the Qatari government in various enterprises. The MOL and the ILO have worked closely on the development of law and policy, systems, enhanced the capacity of inspectors and Communications campaigns, including measures to keep workers and workplaces safe during the COVID-19 pandemic.

United Arab Emirates

The United Arab Emirates has a work visa sponsorship system to issue work permits for foreign nationals who wish to migrate for work in the UAE. Most of the visas are sponsored by institutions and companies. A person looking to enter the UAE for work obtains a work permit, valid for two months, from the Ministry of Human Resources. The sponsor is responsible for medical testing and obtaining identity cards, documents and stamps. The employee can then sponsor his or her family members and bring them into the UAE. Per Article 1 of Ministerial Decree No. 766 of 2015, an employee whose contract expires can obtain a new permit and may remain in the UAE on a 6-month job seeker visa. A new work permit is also issued if the employer fails legal and contractual obligations such as not paying wages for 60 days. A worker may request his contract to be terminated after at least 6 months of employment. A worker whose employment is terminated unfairly has the right to receive a new work permit without the six-month condition.

The right of alien residence and work permit is protected by the UAE Federal law No. 6 of 1973 on the Entry and Residence of aliens. Per UAE law, an employer may not deny an employee on a work visa right to an annual leave, regular paid wage, 45 days maternity leave, right to resign, resign gratuity, and a 30-day grace period to find a new job. An employer is also prohibited by law from confiscating an employee's passport, forcing the employee to pay for his or her residency visa fees, or forcing the employee to work more than eight hours a day or 45 hours a week without compensation. An employee who wishes to leave needs to complete his or her legal notice period, which is usually 30 days or less, before leaving their job or risk being banned to work in UAE for up to one year. Alien widows or divorced women whose legal presence in the country was sponsored by their husband's work status are given a 1-year visa to stay in the country without the need for a work permit or a sponsor.

Incident of domestic workers abuse
In October 2014, Human Rights Watch estimated that there were 146,000 female migrant domestic workers in the UAE whose work visa was sponsored by employers in the UAE. In an interview with 99 female domestic workers, HRW listed abuses claimed by their interviewees: most had their passports confiscated by their employers; in many cases, wages were not fully paid, overtime (up to 21 hours per day) was required, or food, living conditions or medical treatment was insufficient. 24 had been physically or sexually abused. HRW criticized the UAE government for failing to adequately protect domestic workers from exploitation and abuse and made many recommendations to the UAE, including repeal or amendment of Federal Law No. 6 of 1973 on the Entry and Residence of Foreigners, so that domestic workers can decide on their own to change between employers without losing their immigration status. The UAE introduced Ministerial Decree No. 766 of 2015, which allows a worker to terminate his contract without losing their immigration status if the employer has treated him or her unfairly and be issued a new work permit, or to request the contract to be terminated without losing immigration status and receive a new work permit after at least 6 months of employment provided they have found a new employer.

The act of confiscating passports is illegal and against UAE law.

UAE Domestic Workers Rights Bill
In June 2017, the UAE adopted a new bill to bring its labour law into consistency with the International Labour Organization's (ILO) Domestic Workers Convention, providing migrant domestic workers with the same labour protections as other UAE employees. The bill requires employers to provide domestic workers with accommodation and food, and annual minima of 30 days of paid leave, 15 days of paid sick leave, 15 days of unpaid sick leave, compensation for work-related injuries or illnesses, and 12 hours' daily rest.

See also
 Debt bondage
 Exit visa
 Illegal emigration
 Migrant workers in the Gulf Cooperation Council region
 Treatment of South Asian labourers in the Gulf Cooperation Council region
 Migrant domestic workers in Lebanon
 Workforce nationalization

References

External links
 Qatar Labour Law (Kafala) Full Text

Immigration law
Unfree labour
Migrant workers
Gulf Cooperation Council